A general election was held in the U.S. state of Vermont on November 2, 2004. All of Vermont's executive officers were up for election as well as Vermont's at-large seat in the U.S. House and Class 3 U.S. Senate seat. The 2004 presidential election was also held at the same time.

Governor

Lieutenant Governor

Incumbent Republican Lieutenant Governor Brian E. Dubie (since 2003) ran again for a second term.

Republican primary
Brian E. Dubie was unopposed in the Republican primary.

Democratic primary

Candidates
Robert Wolcott Backus, Democratic candidate for U.S. Senate in 2000
Cheryl Pratt Rivers, Member of the Vermont Senate from Windsor County (1991-2003)

Results

Progressive primary
Steve Hingtgen, member of the Vermont House of Representatives from Chittenden 7-2 (1999-2003) and Chittenden 3-3 (2003-2005), ran unopposed in the Progressive primary.

General election

Candidates
Brian E. Dubie (R)
Steve Hingtgen (P)
Cheryl Pratt Rivers (D)
Peter Stevenson (LU)

Debates and forums
WDEV Lt. Governor Candidate Forum 10/7/2004

Results

Secretary of State

Incumbent Democratic Secretary of State Deborah Markowitz (since 1999) ran unopposed for a fourth term.

Democratic primary
Markowitz ran unopposed in the Democratic primary.

Republican primary
Markowitz also ran unopposed in the Republican primary as a write-in candidate.

General election

Candidates
Deborah Markowitz (D)

Results

Treasurer

Incumbent Democratic Treasurer Jeb Spaulding (since 2003) ran unopposed for a second term.

Democratic primary
Spaulding ran unopposed in the Democratic primary.

Republican primary
Spaulding also ran unopposed in the Republican primary as a write-in candidate.

General election

Candidates
Jeb Spaulding (D)

Results

Attorney General

Incumbent Attorney General William H. Sorrell (since 1997) ran again for a fifth term.

Democratic primary
Sorrell was unopposed in the Democratic primary.

Republican primary

Candidates
Dennis Carver
Sylvia R. Kennedy
Karen Ann Kerin, Republican candidate for U.S. Representative in 2000 and 2002

Results

Progressive primary

Candidates
Susan A. Davis, Progressive nominee for State Representative from Orleans 2 in 2002
Boots Wardinski, Liberty Union nominee for Attorney General in 2002, for State Representative in 2000, 1998, 1996, and for State Senator in 1992 and 1990, farmer

Results

Liberty Union nomination
After losing the Progressive primary, Boots Wardinski ran unopposed for the Liberty Union State Committee's nomination.

Libertarian nomination
After losing the Republican primary, Karen Ann Kerin, Republican candidate for U.S. Representative in 2000 and 2002, ran unopposed for the Libertarian State Committee's nomination.

Grassroots nomination
James Mark Leas ran unopposed for the Grassroots State Committee's nomination.

General election

Candidates
Karen Ann Kerin (L)
Dennis Carver (R)
Susan A. Davis (P)
William H. Sorrell (D)
Boots Wardinski (LU)
James Mark Leas (GR)

Results

Auditor of Accounts

Incumbent Democratic Auditor Elizabeth M. Ready (since 2001) ran again for a third term.

Democratic primary
Ready ran unopposed in the Democratic primary.

Republican primary
Randy Brock ran unopposed in the Republican primary.

Liberty Union nomination
Jerry Levy, Liberty Union nominee for Treasurer in 2002, U.S. Senate in 2000, 1998, 1994, 1992, 1988, 1986, and 1982, Vermont Secretary of State in 1984, and Auditor in 1980, ran unopposed for the Liberty Union State Committee's nomination.

General election

Candidates
Randy Brock (R)
Jerry Levy (LU)
Elizabeth M. Ready (D)

Results

References

External links

 
Vermont